The 1940–41 Penn State Nittany Lions men's ice hockey season was the 2nd season of play for the program and the first in over 30 years. The Nittany Lions represented Pennsylvania State University and were coached by Arthur Davis.

Season
After nearly three decades of effort, the student body was finally able to convince the school's Athletic Association to recognize ice hockey as a varsity sport. Penn State continued to play teams in the Pennsylvania Intercollegiate League, a club sport conference, but also added other varsity clubs to its schedule. Due to a lack of ice facilities around the Penn State campus, the Nittany Lions played most of their matches in Johnstown, Pennsylvania.

Roster

Standings

Schedule and results

|-
!colspan=12 style=";" | Regular Season

Note: Most of Penn State's opponents were club teams.

Scoring statistics

References

External links

Penn State Nittany Lions men's ice hockey seasons
Penn State
Penn State
Penn State
Penn State